Die Bakchantinnen is a 1931 German-language opera by Egon Wellesz to libretto by the composer after Euripides' play The Bacchae.

Recording
Thomas Mohr, Michael Burt, Harald Stamm, Roberta Alexander & Claudia Barainsky. Berlin Deutsche Symphony Orchestra, Gerd Albrecht Orfeo - Musica Rediviva

References

1931 operas
German-language operas
Operas
Operas based on works by Euripides
Works based on The Bacchae
Operas by Egon Wellesz